Radohova Vas is a village southeast of Šentvid pri Stični in the Municipality of Ivančna Gorica in central Slovenia. The area is part of the historical region of Lower Carniola. The municipality is now included in the Central Slovenia Statistical Region. 

In the early 20th century an Early Iron Age burial ground was discovered and partially excavated west of the settlement.

Gallery

References

External links
Radohova Vas on Geopedia

Populated places in the Municipality of Ivančna Gorica